Carseldine railway station is located on the North Coast line in Queensland, Australia. It serves the Brisbane suburb of Carseldine and Fitzgibbon

History
In September 1985, the Queensland Government provided funding to build Carseldine station in the state budget. 
The station was opened by the Minister for Transport Don Lane in June 1986. Lifts were installed in 1999. On 28 August 2000, a third platform opened as part of the addition of a third track from Northgate to Bald Hills.

Services
Carseldine is served by all City network services from Kippa-Ring to Central, many continuing to Springfield Central.

Services by platform

Transport links
Brisbane Transport operates one route to and from Carseldine station:
340: to Woolloongabba station

References

External links

Carseldine station Queensland Rail
Carseldine station Queensland's Railways on the Internet

Railway stations in Brisbane
North Coast railway line, Queensland
Railway stations in Australia opened in 1986